Sebastian Kurz (born 27 August 1986) is a former Austrian politician who twice served as chancellor of Austria, initially from December 2017 to May 2019 and then a second time from January 2020 to October 2021.

Kurz was born and raised in Meidling, Vienna. He entered politics by joining the Young People's Party (JVP) in 2003 and rose through the ranks there over the following years. As a result of a cabinet reshuffle in 2011, Kurz received his first government mandate as state secretary responsible for socially integrating refugees. After the 2013 legislative election, Kurz became the country's foreign minister and remained its top diplomat until December 2017.

In May 2017, Kurz succeeded ÖVP chairman Reinhold Mitterlehner and ran as chancellor candidate of his party in the 2017 legislative election. He campaigned on modernizing the Austrian political and bureaucratic apparatus as well as handling the social and immigration issues the country was facing after the European refugee crisis. His perceived reformist approach, rhetorical skills and youth were cited as the prime reasons for his landslide victory. Kurz was subsequently charged with forming his first cabinet. He opted for a coalition with the far-right Freedom Party of Austria (FPÖ). During his first chancellorship, Kurz was credited with mostly following through on his campaign pledges, but his leadership style was widely criticised as uncooperative and hasty. Several political scandals, culminating with the Ibiza affair in 2019, ended the ÖVP–FPÖ coalition. As a result of him no longer commanding the support of Parliament, Kurz and his Cabinet were ousted.

Following the 2019 snap election, he returned to power and formed a coalition with the environmentalist Green Party this time. Kurz and his second cabinet were inaugurated in January 2020. Their agenda, however, was swiftly put in limbo by the surging COVID-19 pandemic. His response to the pandemic included lockdowns and curfews. An investigation into the Ibiza affair by a parliamentary subcommittee, an unstable Cabinet plagued by resignations, and ultimately a corruption inquiry, forced Kurz to resign the chancellorship in October 2021. However, remaining party chair and parliamentary leader allowed him to retain control over government affairs, and thus he came to be known as "shadow chancellor". Two months later, Kurz quit politics entirely and started working as a global strategist for Peter Thiel.

Kurz was the youngest chancellor in Austrian history as well as the youngest head of government in the world for about four years. His youth and political tenor were credited with revitalizing the traditional conservative movement in Austria, and to a larger extent in Europe.

Personal life 
Kurz was born in Vienna, the only child of Elisabeth and Josef Kurz. His father is an engineer and his mother is a grammar school teacher. Kurz's maternal grandmother Magdalena Müller, born 1928 in Temerin, Kingdom of Serbs, Croats and Slovenes (today Vojvodina, Serbia), is a Danube Swabian who fled from the city and settled in Zogelsdorf (today in Austria) during World War II, after the Yugoslav Partisans and the Red Army started to regain the territory that was then occupied by the Kingdom of Hungary. Kurz was brought up in Meidling, the 12th district of Vienna, where he still lives. He obtained his Matura certificate in 2004, completed compulsory military service in 2005, and began studying law at the University of Vienna the same year. Later, he dropped out of university and focused on his political career. Kurz is in a relationship with economics teacher Susanne Thier; they have a son named Konstantin together.

Early career

Youth branch 
Kurz had been a member of the Young People's Party (JVP) since 2003 and was 'sponsored' by Markus Figl. From 2008 to 2012, he was chairman of Young People's Party of Vienna. As chairman, he led the youth arm of the electoral campaign of the Austrian People's Party (ÖVP) into the 2010 Viennese state election and coined the electoral campaign's controversial slogan "black makes [you] cool" (Schwarz macht geil), a play on the official party color as well as the colloquial term "geil" which literally translates to "horny". Kurz used a black painted SUV termed the "Geilomobil" (cool/horny automobile) for official campaign trips in Vienna. Kurz was elected chairman of the Austrian JVP at a federal party convention in 2009, where he received 99 percent of the vote; five years later he was reelected with 100 percent. In 2017, attorney Stefan Schnöll succeeded Kurz as chairman. From 2009 to 2016, Kurz served as a deputy co-chair of the Viennese People's Party. From 2010 to 2011, he was a member of the Viennese State and Municipality Diet, where he focused on "generational equality and fair pensions", before being nominated as state secretary of the Interior Ministry for integration in June 2011, ensuing a reshuffle of the first Faymann cabinet. Following the 2013 Austrian legislative election, in which he won the most direct votes of any candidate, he briefly served as a member of the Parliament. In December 2013, Kurz resigned his parliamentary seat to become the country's youngest foreign minister at age 27.

State Secretary 
Kurz opined that a healthy and open relation between the government and religious communities was pivotal for social integration. During his first months as state secretary for integration, Kurz suggested several policy changes, including a second obligatory preschool year for students with poor language skills. In 2011, the Foreign Ministry, the Austrian Integration Fund and the Education Ministry launched the joint venture Zusammen:Österreich (Together:Austria), which aimed at familiarizing immigrants with Austrian culture and traditions, and sought to convey Western tenets, such as religious freedom and democracy. Zusammen:Österreich deployed so-called "integration ambassadors" to public schools, which were responsible for furthering immigrant children's "identification with Austria" through dialog.

During his term as state secretary, Kurz received an annual budget totaling €15 million as of 2011. The budget was raised to €100 million by 2017. The surge was primarily the result of a large-scale expansion of German language classes by the government.

Foreign Minister 

Following the 2013 legislative election, Kurz replaced Michael Spindelegger as head of the Foreign Ministry. In March 2014, the Foreign Ministry also became responsible for integration-related issues. Kurz declared the improvement of Austria's relation with the Western Balkans one of his top policy priorities. "For historical reasons" a committed relation with Israel and the Jewish community were also 'imperative' to Kurz.

During a visit to Belgrade in February 2014, he reaffirmed – in part because of national economic and political interests – Austria's continued support for the accession of Serbia to the European Union (EU).

In November 2014, Kurz launched the "#stolzdrauf" campaign, which sought to encourage people in displaying patriotism on social media. Among the supporters of the campaign were celebrities, such as the former Miss Austria Amina Dagi and musician Andreas Gabalier, according to the Frankfurter Allgemeine Zeitung. Former president Heinz Fischer, Austrian Airlines, the Jewish Community and the Islamic Religious Community were also involved in some form. The campaign was officially launched at a press conference which was later jeopardized by the alt-right identitarian movement. The amount of money invested by the Foreign Ministry on the campaign's promotion were heavily criticized; expenditures totaled €326,029 in only five to six weeks, 55% of which were spent on boulevard and free newspaper advertisements.

On 25 February 2015, Parliament passed an amendment to the Islam law. The changes bar foreign funding of Islamic religious associations, and were strongly criticised by the Muslim community. It also granted Muslims the right to pastoral care in the military, prisons, hospitals and nursing homes. A German translation of the Qur'an, which had been sought by Kurz, was not included.

In June 2015, Kurz proposed to readjust child benefits received by foreign EU citizens – who work in Austria but whose children remained in their home country – so that it would match the price level of their country. In addition, European foreigners should "pay their fair share for a few years" before being eligible to enroll in Austrian social insurance programs. The Social Democratic Party (SPÖ) opposed this suggestion but agreed that the exploitation of child benefit programs needed to end. The Freedom Party (FPÖ) welcomed the proposal. The Green party accused Kurz of "adopting the FPÖ's hate mentality".

At the end of June 2015, Kurz introduced a long-term policy plan to shut down embassies in Malta, Latvia, Lithuania, and Estonia by autumn 2018 and simultaneously open new ones in Belarus, Moldova, Georgia, Qatar, and Singapore. His plans also included a second Consulate General in China.

In January 2016, in an interview with the daily newspaper Die Welt, Kurz stated "it is understandable that many politicians are afraid of 'ugly pictures' when it comes to border security. However, we cannot simply cede the responsibilities we have regarding our borders to Turkey, because we don't want to get our hands dirty. 'Ugly pictures' are unavoidable". The Green MEP Michel Reimon quoted the latter part in the caption of a photo showing the deceased refugee boy Aylan Kurdi, which went viral on Facebook. Reimon also referred to Kurz as an "inhumane cynic". An ÖVP spokesperson commented: "it is despicable that the Green party exploits the death of this little boy to promote their ideological stances", Aylan had died at a time "where border security did not exist yet".

The Foreign Ministry's Recognition & Evaluation Act was passed by Parliament in July 2016. It allows for the recognition of qualifications acquired abroad as well as the conversion of foreign academic certificates into domestic ones.

During commemorations and military parades to mark the end of World War II, Kurz visited Belarus on 5 May 2015, followed by a visit to Moscow where he met Russian Foreign Minister Sergei Lavrov. He described the annexation of Crimea and Russia's support of Eastern Ukrainian separatists as "contrary to international law". Kurz explained that a softening of EU sanctions would be declined without prior local improvements of the situation and that the implementation of the Minsk II agreement by Russia was imperative. He added that peace could only be achieved "with and not against Russia". In June 2016, he voiced his support for a proposal made by then-German Foreign Minister Frank-Walter Steinmeier to gradually withdraw sanctions in return for promises kept by Russia regarding the Minsk agreement.

In May 2016, Kurz visited Israel and met with Israeli Prime Minister Benjamin Netanyahu. The trip marked 60 years of diplomatic relations between Austria and Israel. Netanyahu and Kurz signed a working holiday visa agreement as well as several arrangements on bilateral educational and cultural issues.

In November 2016, Kurz expressed his gratitude as a representative of the European People's Party in a campaign rally of the Macedonian sister party VMRO-DPMNE for supporting the closure of the Western Balkans route, which was later criticized as an indirect election endorsement.

In March 2017, Kurz referred to rescue operations in the Mediterranean Sea as "NGO insanity", as these would "lead to more refugees dying instead of fewer". Intrigued by the Australian refugee model, Kurz repeatedly demanded that refugees rescued in the Mediterranean Sea should no longer be taken to mainland Italy, but transferred to refugee camps outside of Europe. EU border patrol agency Frontex supported his proposal, while most NGOs opposed it.

In March 2017, the Council of Ministers approved the Integration Act, which was enacted by Parliament two month later. It introduced German language classes for immigrants as well as mandatory "language and value" courses for refugees, and prohibits the distribution of the Quran by Salafists in public areas. It also banned full face veils in public spaces.

In May 2017, an integration ambassador criticized Kurz's immigration policy. According to a survey conducted by magazine Bum Media, two-thirds of the integration ambassadors disagreed with his policy objectives, especially the ban on full face veils.

Under Kurz's term, the cabinet agreed to up funds made available for bilateral relation building from €75 to roughly €150 million by 2021.

At the end of 2016, the Foreign Ministry announced that it had discontinued governmental endowment of Südwind Magazin, which had been published monthly since 1979, for the association Südwind Entwicklungspolitik. This was widely condemned, as it put the magazine in grave financial peril and reportedly undermined freedom of the press in Austria. The publisher of the magazine considered the move "politically idiotic".

As foreign minister, Kurz assumed the yearly-rotating chairmanship of the Organization for Security and Cooperation in Europe (OSCE) in January 2017.

On 18 December 2017, Kurz stepped down as foreign minister to become chancellor. He was succeeded by Karin Kneissl of the FPÖ.

ÖVP chairmanship 
In 2016, several news outlets speculated that Kurz would most likely succeed Reinhold Mitterlehner as chairman of the ÖVP before the 2017 legislative election, and run as the party's chancellor candidate. In 2014, the Kurier already predicted that Kurz would run for the chancellorship in the upcoming election. On 10 May 2017, Mitterlehner abruptly tendered his resignation as party chair and vice chancellor. Following Mitterlehner's departure from politics, the party's Executive Board nominated Kurz as the new chairman on 14 May. However, Kurz declined to succeed Mitterlehner as vice chancellor. Before his official confirmation, Kurz introduced the Executive Board with a list of demands, most notably the power to unilaterally craft the party's federal nominees' list for legislative elections. The Board consented to most of them, some where even enshrined into the party bylaws. The Falter wrote that Kurz had already tested the waters regarding campaign funding before assuming the  chairmanship and reported that  large corporate donors pledged to endow his campaign with several millions of euros.

On 1 July 2017, Kurz was officially elected chairman of the ÖVP by a Federal Party Convention, garnering 98.7% of the delegates' vote and thereby falling just short of Mitterlehner's 99.1%.

2017 legislative election 
In the 2017 legislative election, the ÖVP competed under the alias "Sebastian Kurz list – the new People's Party". Besides Kurz, other nominees on the federal list (Bundesliste) were Elisabeth Köstinger, Josef Moser, Gaby Schwarz, Efgani Dönmez, Maria Großbauer, Rudolf Taschner, Tanja Graf, Karl Mahrer and Kira Grünberg. The first part of the election program, titled "New Justice & Responsibility" (Neue Gerechtigkeit & Verantwortung), was presented on 4 September 2017 and it promised tax cuts, advocated against assets and inheritance taxes and for a reduction of the minimum income obtained by people without Austrian citizenship. Already in June 2017, Kurz had announced that he would aim for a tax relief in the amount of 12 to 14 billion euros annually, counterbalanced by savings in the bureaucracy and "misguided social services", which would in particular affect child and family subsidy as well as the minimum income received by foreigners.

The second part of the program, presented nine days later, comprised economics, education, research, culture and the environment. It also aimed to replace compulsory school attendance with "compulsory education". Children shall "be able to comprehensively read and know the basics of math", otherwise compulsory school attendance shall be extended up until the age of 18. In addition, there shall be a mandatory second kindergarten year for children with insufficient knowledge of the German language. And contributions to the social security system shall be reduced for people with lower incomes.

On 27 September 2017, Kurz presented the third part of the election program; "Order and Security". Anyone arriving illegally shall be returned to their country of origin. If someones requires protection, they shall be harboured in a Protection Center within a third-party country. It also asked for an improved scoring system (Punktesystem) for legal immigration. With regards to government reforms, it wished a more clearly defined separation of responsibilities between the federal government and the state and municipality governments. It also called for structural reforms within the EU, the implementation of the security compact and tougher punishments for violence against women and incitements.

Chancellorship

First (2017–19)

Appointment 
On 15 October 2017, Kurz and his party emerged as victorious from the 2017 legislative election, receiving 1,595,526 votes (31.5%) in the popular vote and thus gaining 15 additional seats, and thereby a plurality, in the Parliament. As the leader of the party with the most seats after the election, Kurz was charged with the formation of a new cabinet by President Alexander Van der Bellen. Since he did not obtain an absolute majority in parliament, Kurz decided to look out for a coalition partner to ensure one. The search turned out rather quick and the ÖVP entered negotiations with the right-wing to far-right FPÖ on 25 October. Negotiations concluded successfully on 15 December and the incoming coalition presented its ministers list to the President. Van der Bellen assented and the Kurz cabinet was sworn in on 18 December 2017.

Cabinet composition 

Under his first cabinet, Kurz received the chancellorship and five ministries, while the FPÖ received the vice chancellorship and six ministries.

It became the first cabinet with FPÖ participation in more than 10 years and – following the Ibiza affair – the first with technocratic participation in more than 90 years. It was succeeded by the first only-technocratic cabinet in Austrian history. Additionally, Herbert Kickl became the first minister to be removed from office against their will as well as the first person serving as party leader to be excluded from re-appointment by a president.

End of term 
On 17 May 2019, the Ibiza affair came to public light. The scandal involved Vice Chancellor and FPÖ chairman Heinz-Christian Strache as well as FPÖ deputy chair Johann Gudenus, who were offered political support by a woman posing as the niece of Russian oligarch Igor Makarov. The incident was recorded on camera and later published by the Süddeutsche Zeitung and Der Spiegel. The video tape showcased the openness of Strache and Gudenus to engage in corruption, their willingness to violate Austrian campaign finance law, and their aspiration to bring nonpartisan news outlets under their control.

The revelation swiftly lead to national and international condemnation. The following day both, Strache and Gudenus, resigned from all positions. Kurz supported keeping the cabinet on the condition that Herbert Kickl be replaced. As Interior Minister, Kickl (a member of the FPÖ) would have overseen the investigation into Strache and Gudenus. Additionally, following the revelation, Kickl quickly moved to appoint his close ally, Peter Goldgruber, director general for Public Security – the supreme authority of Austrian law enforcement – thus causing further controversy and public concern. The FPÖ rejected Kurz ultimatum. As a result, Kurz suspended the coalition agreement and asked President Van der Bellen to remove Kickl from office; the president assented. Following Kickl's removal, the remaining FPÖ ministers tendered their resignation, formally ending the coalition. Kurz filled the vacancies they left with technocrats.

By ending the coalition, Kurz no longer commanded a majority in Parliament. On 27 May, the SPÖ became the first party to officially introduce a motion of no confidence against the entire cabinet (including Kurz). With the concurrence of JETZT and the FPÖ, the resolution received sufficient support to pass. In the history of Austrian republicanism, it was the first motion of no confidence against a chancellor and the entire cabinet to be successful. The next day, the president officially removed all cabinet members from office; although everyone, except for Kurz, was immediately re-appointed to serve in an acting capacity. Finance Minister Hartwig Löger succeeded Kurz and served until he was replaced by Brigitte Bierlein and a caretaker cabinet less than a week later.

Second (2020–21)

Appointment 

In September 2019, the ÖVP won the 2019 legislative election in a landslide, receiving 1,789,417 votes and 37.5% of the total valid votes cast, enough for a wide plurality in the Parliament. Consequently, Kurz picked up an additional nine seats in parliament. It is the second consecutive election that the ÖVP emerged as the clear winner. As a result of the election, Kurz was again tasked with the formation of a new cabinet by President Alexander Van der Bellen on 7 October. Throughout October, Kurz held several exploratory meetings with the SPÖ, the FPÖ, NEOS, and the Green Party, which had experienced a grand comeback in the 2019 legislative election, after having dropped out of the Parliament following the 2017 election, and excluding the JETZT party, which failed to secure a minimum of 4 seats to obtain parliamentary representation. On 11 November, Kurz announced that the ÖVP would enter into coalition negotiations with the Green Party.

At the end of December it was reported that coalition negotiations had concluded successfully. The program for the new cabinet was introduced to the general public on 2 January 2020. The executive board of the ÖVP approved the coalition agreement the next day, the Green Party federal congress followed on 4 January.

Kurz was sworn in as Chancellor by President Van der Bellen on 7 January 2020 at 10:00 UTC.

Cabinet composition 

Under his second cabinet, Kurz received the chancellorship and eight ministries, while the Green party received the vice chancellorship and four ministries.

The second cabinet comprised significantly more partisan appointees and Kurz loyalists – e.g. both Blümel and Nehammer previously served as ÖVP general secretaries – than the first one. It was also the first cabinet in Austrian history that included the Green party and the first one with a predominantly female membership.

End of term 

Prosecutors allege that Kurz bribed news outlets in 2016 to make anti-Reinhold Mitterlehner propaganda. The bribery scheme aimed at ousting Mitterlehner who served as then-vice chancellor and chair of the ÖVP, so Kurz could take his place. In addition, the WKStA accused Kurz of misappropriating tax payer money, as bribes were allegedly diverted from Finance Ministry funds.

Following the raid, opposition parties unanimously demanded Kurz' resignation and called a special session of the Parliament to vote on a motion of no confidence. The Greens pondered supporting the motion if Kurz was unwilling to voluntarily step down but were also supportive of continuing the coalition cabinet if Kurz was replaced. On 9 October 2021, Kurz resigned the chancellorship but announced his intentions to remain party chairman and assume direct leadership of the party in the Parliament. The Greens accepted Kurz' bargain, while opposition parties strongly condemned the move and said that Kurz would continue "pulling the strings".

On 11 October 2021, at 11:00 UTC, President Alexander Van der Bellen officially removed Kurz from office and appointed his nominee then-Foreign Minister Alexander Schallenberg chancellor of Austria.

Shadow (2021) 
Following Kurz' resignation as chancellor, news outlets, political analysts and the general public briefly referred to him as "shadow chancellor" – who continued to be, in effect, chief of government – albeit Kurz himself disavowed that label. As leader of the senior party of the coalition cabinet, Kurz remained the leading lawmaker and held the power to introduce motions of no confidence at will. He indirectly retained control over most government ministries, as they were headed by partisan loyalists, who had continuously voiced their unwavering fidelity to him.

On 11 October 2021, Kurz was unanimously elected parliamentary leader of the ÖVP. Three days later, Kurz was officially sworn in as member of parliament. On 15 October, anti-corruption prosecutors filed an extradition request with the Parliament to lift his legal immunity; the ÖVP "welcomed" the request, as it would "allow Kurz to be vindicated of any allegations of corruption". In the first week of his chancellorship, Alexander Schallenberg reaffirmed that he sought a close cooperation with Kurz, and that he would stick to the former chancellor's policy objectives.

On 16 November 2021, a parliamentary subcommittee unanimously voted to strip Kurz of his immunity; a plenary session formally enacted the vote two days later, allowing anti-corruption prosecutors to resume the criminal probe.

On 3 December 2021, Kurz resigned all of his remaining positions and quit politics entirely. He was succeeded by Karl Nehammer as party chairman and August Wöginger as parliamentary leader. He cited his newborn son as the prime reason for this departure.

Political actions

Social issues

Family Bonus Plus Act 

In June 2018, Kurz introduced a social security reform package termed the Family Bonus Plus Act, which was passed by the Parliament in July and became effective in January 2019. The act offers annual income tax deductions for parents up to €1,500 per under aged child (€125 per month) and €500 per of age child. The act only affects parents who already receive child benefits from the government. If at least one parent has a monthly net income of €1,350, parents become eligible for the maximum deductible amount of €1,500 per anum. The minimum deductible amount is €250 and can be claimed by every employed single parent, regardless of their monthly income; unemployed parents are ineligible for deductions.

Additionally, the Family Bonus Plus Act supersedes multiple other child benefit programs, such as the Child Tax Credit which offered €600 and €440 direct grants, to couples and single parents respectively; as well as the Childcare Expenses Mitigation Program which offered parents €2,300 annually per child younger than 10 years old.

The SPÖ and welfare advocates starkly condemned the reform package for "solely benefiting the well off and completely omitting the low earners and unemployed".

Social Security Act 
In November 2018, the Cabinet completed drafting a major overhaul bill – affecting the basic income and unemployment insurance laws – known as the Social Security Act. Parliament enacted the bill in March 2019 and it took effect the following month. The act 'federalizes' the basic income; it sets the fundamental rules and minimum standards, while authorizing state governments to create local ordinances that regulate the details.

The Social Security Act introduces a nationwide basic income ceiling at €863.04 monthly for singles and €1,208.26 monthly for couples. Under the act, parents receive a complementary €215 for their first child, €129 for their second one, and €43 from the third one onward. Foreigners now become eligible for the basic income after a registered five-years stay in Austria or if they previously served as employers. Immigrants with a meager understanding of the German language now receive a reduced basic income of €563 per month; Kurz argued that the difference of €300 would pay for their German language classes. Immigrants that improve their language skills to German level B1 or English level C1 become qualified for the ordinary basic income. Furthermore, all recipients (except for the permanently unemployable) now have to re-apply for the basic income on an annual basis.

Social Insurance Reform Act 
On 13 December 2018, as part of Kurz's campaign promise to modernize Austrian public administration, Parliament enacted a major social insurance overhaul bill introduced by his cabinet; the Social Insurance Reform Act. The bill attempts to wind down redundant bureaucratic processes by merging social insurers, laying off "superfluous functionaries", and modernizing workplaces. Kurz explained that "centralizing the social insurance system will considerably benefit the insured".Implementation began in April 2019, under the supervision of an ad hoc subcommittee of Parliament, and concluded in 2020, rendering the act fully effective.

Austria has a national, publicly-funded health system. Although health insurance was always national, the system was originally administered by state-level insurers.

The act merges
 the state-level general and specialised insurances into a federalized, single-payer healthcare system (ÖGK),
 the Social Insurance for Commerce (SVA) with the Social Insurance for Agriculture (SVB), to form the Social Insurance of the Self-employed and Freelancers (SVS),
 the Accident Insurance of Public Servants, Accident Insurance for Railroads and Mining, and the Viennese Health Insurance for Public Transport into the Accident Insurance for Public Servants, Railroads and Mining.

The Government Pension Fund (PVA) and the General Accident Insurance (AUVA) remain unchanged. While the Social Insurance Association, which oversees all social insurances, was disempowered and cut down.

All opposition parties, the chairman of the Social Insurance Association and various insurance and welfare experts decried the changes, commenting "the bill would not centralize but decentralize and harm an effective and perfectly functional system, and are hence disadvantageous to the insured". The  mergers cost the government approximately €300 to €400 million.

Immigration

Compulsory German language classes 
On 16 May 2018, the Kurz cabinet enacted compulsory German language classes in the Parliament.

As of 1 January 2019, all primary (Volksschule) and secondary schools (Hauptschule, Gymnasium) are legally required to establish mandatory German language classes (which deviate from regular classes) for children with a lacking knowledge of the German language, denoted "extraordinary students"; however, such classes are only established when there is a minimum of eight such pupils per school. Extraordinary students are determined by a nationwide test (administered by the principal) when signing up for a school, or when having entered school during a school year and being new to Austria. When tests do conclude an "insufficient" knowledge of the German language, pupils are obliged to attend German language classes for fifteen hours per week in primary schools and twenty hours per week in secondary schools. Extraordinary students would remain in these classes until a maximum tenure of four semesters or when having at least improved their skills to an "inadequate" knowledge of the German language; their language level would be examined every semester through a ministerial test. Such students would attend joint subjects, such as drawing, music, gymnastics and handicraft, with their original regular class.

The new law replaced a previous act, which allowed pupils to voluntarily attend German language classes for eleven hours per week. Cabinet argued that the previous law was not effective enough and did not achieve the desired results. The new initiative faced great opposition by schools, their representatives and the opposition parties. Opponents argued that yet alone the Viennese schools would require 500 additional rooms. Furthermore, extraordinary students may face discrimination, many teachers do not have the necessary requirements, costs for the implementation are gigantic and all extraordinary students are in the same class regardless of their age, which prevents them from learning efficiently.

Child Benefits for Foreigners Reform Act 
In October 2018, the Kurz cabinet passed the Child Benefits for Foreigners Reform Act. The bill affects foreign citizens of the European Union (EU) that are employed in Austria, but whose children reside in their home country. The act adjusts child benefits received by these foreign workers to the local price level of their home country. Civil workers – such as nurses – are especially pertained by the changes.

The European Commission decried the bill and reminded that EU laws expressly disallowed favoring domestic workers over European foreign. The commission announced its intention to file a civil suit against Austria in the European Court of Justice.

Global Compact for Migration 
On 31 October 2018, Kurz declared that Austria would not join the Global Compact for Migration, claiming it would encroach on the country's sovereignty and fail to demarcate illegal (economic migration) from legal immigration (asylum).

Miscellany

Working Hours Reform Act 
In July 2018, the Kurz cabinet passed an amendment to the working time law (Arbeitszeitgesetz) in the Parliament, which has commonly been referred to as the "12 hour work day" (12-Stunden-Arbeitstag). Cabinet skipped the common assessment process (Begutachtungsprozess) for the amendment. The average work time in Austria was eight hours per day, the amendment extended the maximum work time of ten hours per day to twelve hours, and the fifty hours work time per week to sixty hours. Chancellor Kurz and his cabinet commented the changes with "legally allowing employees to work more a day on a voluntary basis. In theory, employees could legally decline an employer's request to work longer.

Prior to the amendment it has only been possible to work longer than ten hours per day in certain circumstances and with the explicit assent of the works council. Supporters of these changes have been the Economic Chamber and the Federation of Industries. Opponents on the other side, have been the SPÖ, the Peter Pilz List, the Chamber for Workers and Employees, and the Trade Union Federation. Opponents have raised strong concerns regarding the amendment, doubting that an appliance of the "voluntary basis" is actually possible in practice, since they expect the employer to dismiss a denial of the employee to work longer and threaten them with suspension and discharge.

Monitoring compact 
In April 2018, the coalition enacted the monitoring compact, officially titled security compact. The ÖVP already attempted to pass such a law in the previous legislative period, but failed since their bill presented before the Parliament was rejected by all other parties, including their current and former coalition partner.

The compact allows for authorities to monitor messenger services, such as WhatsApp and Skype, of a person that has committed a crime punishable with a maximum of ten years imprisonment, or five years when life and sexual integrity are endangered, or is suspected of being a potential terrorist. With the new compact, authorities would be empowered to order telecommunication companies to save a person's data up to one year if they are suspected of committing a specific crime. Should the initial suspicion not be substantiated throughout the investigation, then authorities' directive to store data would turn void and the surveillance target must be informed of their investigation. Furthermore, the optical and acoustic surveillance in the public are also planned to be expanded, and authorities would be able to access the video and audio surveillance of government-operated or funded organisations, such as public transportation services, airports, and railway stations, which are obliged to store recordings for a tenure of four weeks. The license plate recognition systems (Kennzeichenerkennungssysteme) are also intended to be advanced, with them being able to detect the driver, license plate, type and color of any car. IMSI-catchers used by the police would be able to localise phones without contacting the respective telecommunication company. Anonymous prepaid cards would no longer be available and only sim cards would remain, which require one to register their identity.

The compact would stand for five years and be evaluated after three years. Jurists, attorneys, the Constitutional Service and many others, have expressed their strong concerns regarding the compact and have accused it of infringing the very basis of liberty. Both the SPÖ and NEOS have announced to file one-third petitions in parliament to trigger a lawsuit against the compact before the Constitutional Court; the SPÖ aims to introduce its petition in the Federal Council, where it already possesses one-thirds of the seats, while NEOS would introduce theirs in the Parliament, hoping for the support of the SPÖ to derive the remaining votes necessary.

Digital Office 

On 19 March 2019, the Kurz cabinet presented the mobile application Digital Office for Android and IOS as well as the website oesterreich.gv.at; both platforms combine and centralize existing online services of government that allow for citizens to interact with authorities through the internet. While both are generally the same, the mobile app was labeled "more comfortable" by cabinet. The concept for both platforms was drafted by Margarete Schramböck, Minister of Digital Affairs, and subsequently developed by her ministry. Digitalizing government services and bureaucracy has been an election promise of Kurz. The services data.gv.at and help.gv.at were merged into the new platforms, although data.gv.at is intended to additional remain as an independent website. The new platforms currently allow users to:
 register a new, and cancel the current, main residence (Hauptwohnsitz);
 request certificates for newborn children;
 store passport pictures;
 receive an automatic notification when a passport's validity expires; and
 request a voting card (Wahlkarte) for an upcoming election.

Additional services are intended to be added that would allow users to: 
 request a new passport (June);
 register and cancel side residences (Nebenwohnsitze) (June);
 file a loss report for certificates and other legal documents (June); and
 use the digital driving license (December, at the latest beginning 2020).

The digital driving license would for the moment only be usable domestically, since there are no European-wide regulations for such licenses. Registering for those platforms requires a mobile signature. There currently are more than 1,1 million registered mobile signatures.

Council of the European Union presidency 
During Austria's presidency of the Council of the European Union, which lasted from July to December 2018, Kurz advocated for an increased protection of the Schengen Area and suggested that Frontex border guards should prevent any migrant boat from entering Europe.

The smoking ban 
In March 2018, the Kurz cabinet repealed a general smoking ban enacted by its predecessor, the Kern cabinet, which was slated to take effect on 1 May 2018. The reversal was a long-standing campaign promise and policy objective of the FPÖ, which insisted that it be included in the coalition agreement and the official cabinet agenda. Despite publicly supporting the smoking ban, the ÖVP reluctantly voted for its repeal in Parliament as part of this bargain.

The reversal remains one of the most controversial acts of Kurz's first chancellorship, as his own and all opposition parties, a dozen gastronomy and health specialists, as well as the majority of Austrians opposed it.

The smoking ban would have completely prohibited the use of cigarettes in all coffee shops and restaurants, which had previously still been allowed within designated smoking areas. However, as part of the reversal bill, the Cabinet also illegalized the sale of tobacco to minors and disallowed smoking in cars if children are present.

Following the end of the smoking ban, an anti-smoking campaign known as "Don't smoke" became viral. The campaign's anti-smoking plebiscite – that would have forced Parliament to reconsider the reversal – garnered more than 880,000 votes, which made up 13.8% of Austria's population at the time, and was one of the most successful petitions in the country's history. Nevertheless, it fell just short of the 900,000 votes threshold, which had been raised by FPÖ party chairman and Vice Chancellor Heinz-Christian Strache beforehand. Strache received massive amounts of criticisms for that, as he had pledged to hear any petition that reaches a scanty 150,000 votes while still in opposition. A lawsuit against the repeal was filed with the Constitutional Court.

Following the collapse of the first Kurz cabinet, Parliament reinstated the smoking ban in July 2019; all parties, but the FPÖ, voted in favor.

Political positions

Islam policy 
Under Kurz, the Foreign Ministry asked university professor and Islam specialist Ednan Aslan to create a study on Islamic kindergartens. A preliminary report, published at the end of 2015, came to the conclusion that Salafist sentiments among society were on the rise, and that there was a surging support for Islamist ideologies. As a result, the government of Vienna and the Foreign Ministry jointly agreed to conduct a more comprehensive, scientific study on the matter. In addition, the Viennese government began to vet Islamic kindergartens more carefully and subjected them to increased scrutiny. In June 2017, Kurz demanded that all Islamic kindergartens be completely shut down, as they had "isolated pupils – linguistically and culturally – from society". After a Falter investigation accused the Foreign Ministry of having changed specific contents of the study's report, stark public controversy emerged; Aslan backed the Ministry's version of the report. The University of Vienna launched a scholarly peer review.

Following the ban of full face veils by the Kern cabinet, which Kurz supported, his cabinet also passed a headscarf ban in kindergartens, and intended to expand the ban so that it would also cover elementary schools.

In March 2019, the Cabinet announced its intent to establish a new government agency that monitors Islamic political activities in Austria. Referencing studies which show that a significant amount of Austrian Muslims hold anti-western and antisemitic views, Kurz said that it would be necessary to actively monitor Islamic mosques, clubs, and social media accounts in order to safeguard Austria's liberal, democratic and secular system. He suggested that this planned organisation should be modeled after the Documentation Centre of Austrian Resistance (DÖW) which is responsible for the surveillance 
of right-wing extremism. Key officers of the DÖW generally welcomed the government's proposition.

Same-sex marriage 
A ruling of the Constitutional Court in December 2017 declared most provisions of the Registered Partnership Act to be unconstitutional and overturned them, which ultimately resulted in the legalisation of same-sex marriage in Austria. Both the ÖVP and FPÖ opposed same-sex marriage and previously rejected several bills introduced by the SPÖ, NEOS, and the Green party that would have legalized it prior to the court ruling. Kurz opposes same-sex marriage, and opined that inequality has already been eliminated with the introduction of registered partnerships. He commented: "the official recognition of homosexual couples and their right to adopt children already exists. Hence, legal discrimination is no more".

Counterproliferation 
As foreign minister, Kurz was a vehement advocate of non-proliferation and supported denuclearisation efforts around the globe. He explained that "nuclear weapons are not only a  threat to all of humanity, but also a dark piece of Cold War legacy, that must be resolutely overcome".

Kurz participated in a review of the Treaty on the Non-Proliferation of Nuclear Weapons and, in 2014, successfully organized his own international conference on nuclear disarmament in Vienna.

Economic policy 
In his campaign pledges for the 2017 legislative election, Kurz spoke out against further raising the national debt and for reducing government spending and budget deficits; he intends to realize proposed policies through abolishing the fiscal drag (Kalte Progression) and by cutting the payroll and income taxes. Kurz opposes any sorts of inheritance, property, and wealth taxes. He wishes for cash to be retained as an ordinary payment method.

In December 2018, Kurz announced a nationwide digital tax to partly fund a major upcoming tax reform. The digital tax topic has previously been discussed on European level but no agreement came about.

Message control 
As chancellor, Kurz instated a strict regulation to manage and oversee the communication of government and the ministries. The concept is intended to exhibit a uniform and almost synchronous appearance of government, of which no cabinet member could stand out through their individual views and stances. Journalists have accused the Kurz cabinet, through rejecting questions and by applying other methods of message control, of efforts to control and otherwise influence the media coverage. Kurz himself reduced his communication to short and often repeated sentences and keywords.

Public profile 

Following Kurz's inaugural visit to Berlin as foreign minister, the Frankfurter Allgemeine Zeitung described him as "highly eloquent", "succinct", and "everything but sheepish", and nicknamed him the "young Metternich". In December 2014, the German Press Agency ranked Kurz as one of "the seven winners on the political world stage of 2014".

Anna von Bayern of Focus wrote that "one really notices the new and confident approach of the Foreign Ministry", adding that "Kurz bestowed upon it new relevance". In March 2016, Franz Schandl of Der Freitag described Kurz as someone who "puts on a friendly face" but is actually indistinguishable from a right-wing populist. In 2017, the Time magazine listed Kurz as one of ten "Next Generation Leaders", referring to him as the "statesman of a new kind", who found a way to deal with the European refugee crisis and whose pragmatic approach has been a "story of success adopted even by other European politicians". Die Welt described Kurz as a "conservative-liberal, European-minded politician", whose rise to power "in many ways resembled" that of French President Emmanuel Macron. The Neue Zürcher Zeitung praised Kurz as the embodiment of "progress, self-confidence, dynamism, elegance, and determination"; while German Chancellor Angela Merkel was a "token of stagnation", Kurz was "sovereign, considerate towards his critics, and a rhetorical master of the German language" adding that "if Kurz were German, he would be chancellor, or about to be chancellor".

The Rheinische Post wrote "if we take a look at his supporters, Kurz strongly resembles Jörg Haider, the legendary right-wing populist, who set out to end the everlasting SPÖ-ÖVP rule over the country – and ultimately failed. What Kurz seeks to change, remains opaque even after his electoral campaigning. The only thing that's clear is that he wants to become Austria's youngest chancellor".

In June 2018, a commentary of Edward Lucas published by the Financial Times compared the modern political development of Europe and the United States with the political environment of the 1930s. Lucas explained that Kurz was "easily comparable" with U.S. President Donald Trump of the Republican Party and Italian Minister Matteo Salvini of the Lega Nord. Following publication, the Austrian Embassy in Washington, 
D.C. contacted Lucas and demanded that certain "inappropriate" parts of the commentary be redacted; Lucas complied. In December 2018, the term "silent chancellor" became Austria's Word of the Year for the second year running. The jury chose the word because "Kurz avoids commenting on issues that personally displease him and refuses to rebuke or justify contentious actions or statements made by the FPÖ, where the public would conventionally expect clarification from the chancellor".

In 2019 Kurz was first listed by Spiegel Online in the ranking "who will be important abroad?", explaining that "from an international perspective", Kurz had attracted considerable amounts of attention as he was "only 32 years old and governs with right-wing populists". As Kurz's coalition partner, the FPÖ "has pushed the moral boundaries. In the future, unfavorable views on foreigners, refugees, and migrants are likely to increase even more, because Kurz lets his coalition partner say bad things, but remains silent himself. Meanwhile, his job approval remains consistently high". In March 2019, Kurz was elected "word-keeper" of 2018 by the readers of the Deutsche Sprachwelt, and "silent chancellor" became the Austrian Word of the Year.

Kurz's response to the COVID-19 pandemic was soundly unpopular and resulted in a stark decline of his job approval rating; this combined with the corruption inquiry that concluded his political career caused his approval rating to plummet even further. At the end of 2021, the media consortium Organized Crime and Corruption Reporting Project named Kurz "Corrupt Person of the Year Finalist" in its annual contest.

Post-politics
Since 2022, Kurz has been working as a global strategist for Thiel Capital, the California-based private investment company of American billionaire Peter Thiel. On 9 January, he was appointed co-chairman of the European Council on Tolerance and Reconciliation.

Honours

Notes

References

External links 

 Official website (in German)
 Profile of Sebastian Kurz on the website of Parliament (in German)
 Sebastian Kurz at Encyclopædia Britannica

1986 births
21st-century Austrian politicians
21st-century Chancellors of Austria
Austrian anti-communists
Austrian nationalists
Austrian People's Party politicians
Austrian people of German descent
Austrian people of Hungarian descent
Austrian Roman Catholics
Conservatism in Austria
Critics of Islamism
Foreign ministers of Austria
Living people
Members of the National Council (Austria)
Politicians from Vienna